The Tobago least gecko (Sphaerodactylus molei) is a species of lizard in the family Sphaerodactylidae. The species is endemic to the Caribbean and northern South America.

Etymology
The specific name, molei is in honor of British naturalist Richard Richardson Mole (1860–1926) of Port of Spain, Trinidad.

Geographic range
S. molei is found in the Antilles, Guyana, Trinidad and Tobago, and Venezuela including Margarita Island.

Habitat

Description

Reproduction
S. molei is oviparous. The adult female usually lays one egg, rarely two, in a rotten stump.

References

Further reading
Barbour T (1921). "Sphaerodactylus ". Memoirs of the Museum of Comparative Zoology at Harvard College 47 (3): 215–283. (Sphaerodactylus molei, pp. 237–238 + Plate 1, figure 4; Plate 13, figures 5–8). 
Boettger O (1894). "Sphærodactylus molei, Bttgr., n. sp.". p. 80. In: Mole RR, Urich FW (1894). "A Preliminary List of the Reptiles and Batrachians of the Island of Trinidad. With Descriptions of Two New Species by Professor Dr. O. Boettger". Journal of the Field Naturalists' Club, Port-of-Spain, Trinidad 2: 77-90. (Sphaerodactylus molei, new species, p. 80). (in English and Latin).
King W (1962). "Systematics of Lesser Antillean lizards of the genus Sphaerodactylus ". Bulletin of the Florida State Museum 7 (1): 1-52. (Sphaerodactylus molei, pp. 35–38, Figures 13A-13E).

Sphaerodactylus
Reptiles described in 1894
Taxa named by Oskar Boettger